The Diocese of Chotanagpur is the jurisdiction of the Church of North India (since 1970) under the episcopal leadership of the Bishop of Chotanagpur.

See also

Christianity in India
Church of North India

References

 
Anglican
Church of India, Burma and Ceylon